The Technic'air Fly Roller is a French powered parachute that was designed by Pierre Allet and produced by Technic'air of Belvès. Now out of production, when it was available the aircraft was supplied complete and ready-to-fly.

The aircraft was introduced about 1999 and production ended when the company went out of business in 2003.

Design and development
The Fly Roller was designed to comply with the Fédération Aéronautique Internationale microlight category and the U.S. FAR 103 Ultralight Vehicles rules. It features a parachute-style wing, single-place accommodation, tricycle landing gear and a single  JPX D-320 engine in pusher configuration.

The aircraft carriage is a simple frame design, built from steel tubing. In flight steering is accomplished via handles that actuate the canopy brakes, creating roll and yaw. On the ground the aircraft has no nosewheel steering. The main landing gear incorporates spring rod suspension.

A two-seat version, the Technic'air Flyroller Magnum Biplace, was also developed.

Operational history
The designer, Pierre Allet, flew an example of the Fly Roller across the Mediterranean Sea.

Specifications (Fly Roller)

References

External links
Company website archives on Archive.org

Fly Roller
1990s French sport aircraft
1990s French ultralight aircraft
Single-engined pusher aircraft
Powered parachutes